Jamie Pinkerton is an American softball coach who is the current head coach at Iowa State.

Coaching career

Tulsa

Arkansas

Montana

Iowa State
On August 2, 2017, Jamie Pinkerton was announced as the new head coach of the Iowa State softball program, replacing Jamie Trachsel who left for Minnesota.

On July 30, 2021 Iowa State and softball coach Jamie Pinkerton agreed to a contract extension through June 30, 2025.

Pinkerton completed his fourth season at the helm of the Cyclones in 2021, leading Iowa State to the NCAA Tournament for the first time since 1988. After a 34–23 season in 2021, Pinkerton has a record of 105–94 at Iowa State, including a Covid-19 shortened season in 2020. The Cyclones won a pair of games at the 2021 NCAA Regional, advancing to the regional championship for the first time in program history.

Iowa State also earned its first-ever ranking in the NFCA Top-25 Coaches poll on Feb. 23, 2021, debuting at No. 25 in the country. ISU's unprecedented success has been sparked by Pinkerton engineering the greatest offense ever seen in Ames. For the third time in his four seasons at Iowa State, the Cyclones set a new school record for home runs – hitting 64 in just 57 games.

Head coaching record

College

References

Living people
American softball coaches
Tulsa Golden Hurricane softball coaches
Louisiana–Monroe Warhawks softball coaches
Virginia Cavaliers softball coaches
Iowa State Cyclones softball coaches
Montana Grizzlies softball coaches
Arkansas Razorbacks softball coaches
1964 births